Flatbergium is a genus of moss with 2 accepted species. Flatbergium sericeum and Flatbergium novo-caledoniae, originally described as species of Sphagnum, are now considered part of a separate genus on the basis of genetic differences. The Ordovician fossil Dollyphyton has also been assigned to this family.

References

External links

Sphagnales
Monotypic moss genera